Kurodadrillia habui is a species of sea snail, a marine gastropod mollusk in the family Pseudomelatomidae, the turrids.

Description
The length of the shell attains 35 mm.

Distribution
This marine species occurs off Japan.

References

 Azuma, M. (1975) Descriptions of two new species of the family Trochidae and the family Turridae from off Kii, Japan (Mollusca: Gastropoda). Venus, 33, 157–160

habui
Gastropods described in 1975